Trapezites is a genus of skipper butterflies in the family Hesperiidae. All species are endemic to Australia.

Species
The genus includes the following species:

 Trapezites argenteoornatus Hewitson, 1868
 Trapezites atkinsi Williams, Williams & Hay, 1998
 Trapezites eliena Hewitson, 1868
 Trapezites genevieveae Atkins, 1997
 Trapezites heteromacula Meyrick & Lower, 1902
 Trapezites iacchus Fabricius, 1775
 Trapezites iacchoides Waterhouse, 1903
 Trapezites lutea Tepper, 1882
 Trapezites macqueeni Kerr & Sands, 1970
 Trapezites maheta Hewitson, 1877
 Trapezites petalia Hewitson, 1868
 Trapezites phigalia Hewitson, 1868
 Trapezites phigalioides Waterhouse, 1903
 Trapezites praxedes Plötz, 1884
 Trapezites sciron Waterhouse & Lyell, 1914
 Trapezites symmomus Hübner, 1823
 Trapezites taori Atkins, 1997
 Trapezites waterhousei Mayo & Atkins, 1992

References
 Natural History Museum Lepidoptera genus database
 Trapezites at funet

Trapezitinae
Hesperiidae genera